360 Tenth Avenue is an unbuilt skyscraper in the Hell's Kitchen neighborhood of Manhattan in New York City.

See also
List of tallest buildings in New York City

References

External links
 Emporis profile

Skyscrapers in Manhattan
Hell's Kitchen, Manhattan
Proposed buildings and structures in New York City